Internet Tonight (1998 – October 1, 2001) was a television program on the cable network ZDTV (later known as TechTV and G4). The show combined the "effervescent moxie" of Michaela Pereira with the "dry wit" of Scott Herriott, to bring the viewers the latest in Internet trends, humor, and news. Due to the production value it was called the "absolute slickest show [TechTV] had" but was canceled when "Paul [Allen] took a dislike to the show ... and just killed it"

A daily, half-hour show, it was on the launch schedule for ZDTV, and strove to be "the show of record about the Net." Segments included Strange Sites, Incredibly Useful Sites, and Home Sweet Homepage. The collection of these links were amassed into an archive called The Big List and on each show Scott's trademark was to yell 'THE BIG LIST' at its first mention. The show had contributing correspondents, most with their own dedicated segment:
The Surf Guru – ZDTV's night watchman and self-proclaimed net expert played by Ed Marques.
Meghan Marx – the host of Love Online with Match.com
Liam Mayclem – the Music Online reporter and 
Roving reporter SuChin Pak

References

External links 
 

TechTV original programming
Mass media about Internet culture